Thalichi is a small town located in Diamer district, Gilgit-Baltistan, in Pakistan.  Thalichi is home to the famous Nanga Parbat.

Nanga Parbat 
Thalichi is located on the side of Nanga Parbat.  Most people visit Nanga Parbat via Thalichi.

Karakorum Highway 
Thalichi is located on the Karakorum Highway or KKH.  The town has been isolated many times due to landslides and flooding on the highway.  Thalichi is along the route to Gilgit and Chilas.

References 

Towns in Pakistan